My Secret Life was the debut album by the British indie band Billy Ruffian. It was released in 2007.

Track listing
 "Music vs Money" — Billy Ruffian
 "Don’t Want You" — Billy Ruffian/Atkinson
 "Death of a Band" — Billy Ruffian
 "The Apothecary" — Billy Ruffian
 "Youth Club" — Bray/Burrow/Evaskitas
 "Masterminding My Downfall" — Billy Ruffian/Bridle
 "Leaving Soon" — Billy Ruffian
 "Ballad of Billy Ruffian" — Billy Ruffian
 "Turn Your Head" — Billy Ruffian
 "Whipping Boy" — Bray/Evaskitas
 "(My Girlfriend is Like a) Trojan Horse" — Billy Ruffian
 "The Last Day" — Billy Ruffian

Personnel
 Stephen Ruffian – vocals, guitar
 Thom Cuell – lead guitar,
 Ben Paul – bass guitar, drum programming
 Steve Trumpet – trumpet

Singles
Death of a Band/Leaving Soon/Preensters/(My Girlfriend is Like a) Trojan Horse (April 2006)
Death of a Band/Preensters(My Girlfriend is Like a) Trojan Horse (June 2006)
Music vs Money/Whipping Boy/My Secret Life (June 2007)
Masterminding My Downfall/Twenty Eighth Month/Debtor's Lament (20/10/08)

2007 albums